Nicolás Alejandro Tagliafico (born 31 August 1992) is an Argentine professional footballer who plays as a left back for Ligue 1 club Lyon and the Argentina national team.

Biography 
Of Italian origins, his grandparents are from the city of Genoa on the paternal side and Calabrian on the maternal side; he also has Italian citizenship.

Club career

Banfield
Tagliafico made his professional debut for Banfield on a 2−1 away victory against Tigre for the fifth fixture of the 2011 Clausura, coming on as a substitute on the 72nd minute. Due to Marcelo Bustamante's ban, he was a starter the following game, a 2−2 draw with Huracán. In 2012, Tagliafico signed a one-year loan deal with Spanish club Real Murcia.

Independiente
In 2015, he made the move to Independiente for an undisclosed transfer fee and made his professional debut for the club during a 3−2 away win at Newell's Old Boys. Tagliafico would end up captaining the team that won the 2017 Copa Sudamericana.

Ajax
On 5 January 2018, Tagliafico made the move to Ajax for a fee of £4 million and made his professional debut for the club during a 2−0 home win against Feyenoord on 21 January 2018 in the Klassieker.
Since then he has played over 100 league games for the club and scored 7 league goals and became a starter for the team in 2019.

Lyon
On 23 July 2022, he joined Ligue 1 club Lyon on a three-year deal until June 2025, for €4.2 million

International career
Tagliafico has played in all the youth categories of the Argentina national team: under-15, under-17 and under-20. Tagliafico impressed for the Argentina national under-20 football team at the 2011 FIFA U-20 World Cup in Colombia; however, he missed Argentina's final kick in the quarter-final penalty shoot-out against Portugal, meaning Argentina exited that competition 5–4 on penalties (Cartagena, 13 August 2011).

In May 2018, he was named in Argentina's final 23 man squad for the 2018 World Cup in Russia. He also played the 2019 Copa América, and took with Argentina the third place, through a 2–1 victory over Chile in the third-place match.

In June 2021, he was included in Lionel Scaloni's final Argentina 28-man squad for the 2021 Copa América.

He is the only foreign player to became champion at club level (Independiente, Sudamericana 2017) and at international level (Argentina, Copa América 2021) at the Maracaná stadium.

In November 2022, he was named in Argentina's final 26-man squad for the 2022 FIFA World Cup in Qatar by Scaloni. Tagliafico was part of the starting line-up in the final against France, where Argentina won the World Cup by a score of 4–2 on penalties.

Style of play
He is noted for his "lung-busting stamina, excellent technique and continuous enterprise". As a result of his skills, as well as his playing position and club, and nationality, and striking visual resemblance Tagliafico has been compared to the Internazionale and Argentina full-back Javier Zanetti, formerly also of Banfield.

Career statistics

Club

International

Honours
Independiente
Copa Sudamericana: 2017

Ajax
 Eredivisie: 2018–19, 2020–21, 2021–22
 KNVB Cup: 2018–19, 2020–21

Argentina
 FIFA World Cup: 2022
 Copa América: 2021
 CONMEBOL–UEFA Cup of Champions: 2022

Individual
Eredivisie Player of the Month: November 2018

References

External links

Profile at the Olympique Lyonnais website

Statistics at Football-Lineups.com

1992 births
Living people
Sportspeople from Buenos Aires Province
Argentine footballers
Association football defenders
Club Atlético Banfield footballers
Real Murcia players
Club Atlético Independiente footballers
AFC Ajax players
Olympique Lyonnais players
Argentine Primera División players
Primera Nacional players
Segunda División players
Eredivisie players
Argentina youth international footballers
Argentina under-20 international footballers
Argentina international footballers
2018 FIFA World Cup players
2019 Copa América players
2021 Copa América players
2022 FIFA World Cup players
FIFA World Cup-winning players
Copa América-winning players
Argentine expatriate footballers
Expatriate footballers in Spain
Expatriate footballers in the Netherlands
Expatriate footballers in France
Argentine expatriate sportspeople in Spain
Argentine expatriate sportspeople in the Netherlands
Argentine expatriate sportspeople in France
People of Ligurian descent
People of Calabrian descent
Argentine sportspeople of Italian descent
Citizens of Italy through descent